The Tamna Prefectures were administrative  divisions of the Yuan dynasty established after the Sambyeolcho Rebellion and before 1275 in modern-day Jeju Province.

History 

After the Sambyeolcho Rebellion was crushed by the Yuan authorities, 'department for matters regarding conquered country of tamna (耽羅國招討司)' was established in 1273.The exact establishment of the prefecture is unknown, however it is generally thought to be some time before 1275 based on the records of its first darugachi sent to the region in 1275. In 1277,the first stable to raise the horses to meet the need for the Yuan dynasty were established and 160 horses were brought to the region for the project. The prefecture was established after the 'department to comfort the country of tamna (耽羅國安撫司)' was established in 1284, and in 1300, 'prefecture for tamna county' (탐라군민총관부) was established. In 1301, the region became a Manho (萬戶,equivalent to ten mingghan) until 1356.

References

Goryeo
Former commanderies of China in Korea
Prefectures of the Yuan dynasty
Jeju Province
Tamna